This is a list of female party leaders of British political parties.

Parliamentary parties

Alliance Party of Northern Ireland

Conservative Party

Democratic Unionist Party

Green Party of England and Wales

Labour Party

Liberal Democrats

Plaid Cymru

Scottish National Party

Sinn Féin

Social Democratic and Labour Party

Parties with representation in devolved parliaments

Green Party in Northern Ireland

Liberal Vannin Party

Scottish Green Party

Regional branches of parliamentary parties

London Conservatives

Scottish Conservatives

Scottish Labour

Welsh Liberal Democrats

Parties with representation in local government

Alliance for Local Living

Animal Welfare Party

Brexit Party / Reform UK

Guildford Greenbelt Group

Harold Hill Independent Party

Horwich and Blackrod First

Independence for Scotland Party

Lincolnshire Independents

Mebyon Kernow

Orkney Manifesto Group

Progressive Unionist Party

The Rubbish Party

UKIP

Women's Equality Party

Parties with no elected UK representation

Advance Together

Communist Party of Great Britain (Marxist–Leninist)

Freedom Alliance

Left Unity

National Health Action Party

Renew Party

Scottish Socialist Party

Socialist Party (England and Wales)

Workers' Party (Ireland)

Regional branches of parties without elected representation

Reform UK Scotland

Defunct parties

Change UK / The Independent Group for Change

Communist Party of Great Britain

For Britain Movement

Highlands and Islands Alliance

Independent Labour Party

Jersey Democratic Alliance

Nationalist Alliance

No Candidate Deserves My Vote!

Northern Ireland Women's Coalition

Respect Party

Unionist Party of Northern Ireland

Veritas

We Demand a Referendum Now

Women's Party

Active groups which were deregistered by the Electoral Commission

Britain First

References

 
Political parties
Feminism in the United Kingdom
Political parties in the United Kingdom
Leaders of British political parties
Lists of leaders of political parties
Lists of women politicians
History of women in the United Kingdom